Van Tassell may refer to:

Marie Van Tassell
Van Tassell, Wyoming
A namesake of the Van Tassell and Kearney Horse Auction Mart
Van Tassell family, 18th century owners of Sunnyside (Tarrytown, New York)
Baltus and Katrina Van Tassel, characters in The Legend of Sleepy Hollow

See also
Van Tassel
Tassell (surname)